Kilborn is a surname. Notable people with the surname include:

Cecil Kilborn (1902–?), English footballer
Craig Kilborn (born 1962), American comedian, sports and political commentator, actor and television host
John Kilborn (1794 – after 1878), Canadian politician and judge
Leslie Gifford Kilborn (1895–1972), Canadian missionary
Lewis Kilborn (1902–1984)
Michael Kilborn (born 1962), Australian cricketer
Omar Leslie Kilborn (1867–1920), Canadian Methodist missionary and writer
Pam Kilborn (born 1939), Australian athlete
Virginia Kilborn, Australian radio astronomer